Hanover is an unincorporated community and census-designated place (CDP) in Hanover County, Virginia, United States. It is the county seat and is located at the junction of U.S. Route 301 and State Route 54 south of the Pamunkey River. While historically known as Hanover Courthouse, the U.S. Geological Survey, Census Bureau, Postal Service and residents refer to it as "Hanover". The population as of the 2010 census was 252.

Courthouse
Its most notable structure is the Hanover County Courthouse, designated a National Historic Landmark. The attorney Patrick Henry practiced law here and argued the Parson's Cause. It is within the Hanover County Courthouse Historic District, which includes the Hanover Tavern. Rebuilt in 1791 on the site of a Revolutionary-era tavern, the tavern was adapted in 1953 as the Barksdale Theatre, the nation's first dinner theatre. Barksdale was Virginia's first performing arts organization to seat integrated audiences. St. Paul's Episcopal Church was listed on the National Register of Historic Places in 1994.

The Hanover County Courthouse is an operating courthouse. Located along U.S. Route 301, it is across the green from the Hanover Tavern. The courthouse is the third oldest courthouse still in use in the United States. Some local historians cited the courthouse as built in 1735, but the state historical society notes it was built between 1737 and 1742.

Geography
Hanover is located in northeastern Hanover County, south of the Pamunkey River, which forms the border with Caroline County. U.S. Route 301 passes through the center of the CDP, leading south  to the center of Richmond and north  to Bowling Green. Virginia State Route 54 leads west  to Ashland.

Via the Pamunkey River, the community is part of the York River watershed.

Notable people
Robert C. Nicholas, US senator
Patrick Henry, Statesman & founding father

References

External links
 Hanover County Economic Development
 Hanover Tavern history

Census-designated places in Hanover County, Virginia
County seats in Virginia